The World Association of Zoos and Aquariums (WAZA) is the "umbrella" organization for the world zoo and aquarium community. Its mission is to provide leadership and support for zoos, aquariums, and partner organizations of the world in animal care and welfare, conservation of biodiversity, environmental education and global sustainability.

History 
After the International Union of Directors of Zoological Gardens (IUDZG), founded in 1935 at Basel, Switzerland, ceased to exist during World War II, it was refounded in Rotterdam in 1946 by a group of zoo directors from allied or neutral countries. In 1950 IUDZG became an international organisation member of International Union for the Protection of Nature.

In 1991 the IUDZG adopted a new name, World Zoo Organization, and revised its membership rules to include regional zoo associations.

In 2000 the organization got its current name, the World Association of Zoos and Aquariums, to reflect a more modern institution working together at a global level. The association wants to build cooperative approaches to common needs, tackle common issues, share information and knowledge. WAZA also represents the zoo community in other international bodies such as the International Union for Conservation of Nature or at Conferences of the Parties to global Conventions, such as CITES, Convention on Biological Diversity or Convention on Migrating Species.

Organization 
All members of the WAZA network are obliged to comply with “WAZA's Code of Ethics and Animal Welfare”, adopted by WAZA in 2003.

Members of the association include leading zoos and aquariums, and regional and national Associations of Zoos and Aquariums as well as some affiliate organizations, such as zoo veterinarians or zoo educators, from all around the world. Together they are 'United for Conservation'.

Members
WAZA institutional members includes more than 250 zoos and aquaria.

 List of WAZA member zoos and aquariums

In addition, about 1300 zoos are linked to WAZA through membership in one of the about 25 regional or national association members. 

Outside of the WAZA associations with direct memberships, there are also regional organizations who are members of the WAZA through an affiliated regional organization.

Support for zoos and aquariums of the world
According to the organization, there are two characteristics that all the institutions known as ‘zoos’ have in common:
 Zoos possess and manage collections that primarily consist of wild (nondomesticated) animals, of one or more species, that are housed so that they are easier to see and to study than in nature.
 Zoos display at least a portion of this collection to the public for at least a significant part of the year, if not throughout the year.
The definition of "zoo" is a broad one and it may also incorporate aquariums, game reserves, aviaries, safari parks, rescue centers, sanctuaries or even so called "roadside zoos" where animals are often kept in problematic sub-standard conditions.
In the view of the rest of the zoo community, which is committed to the principles of animal welfare and conservation, these roadside zoos do a lot of damage to the image of zoos in general and should be either assisted to reach a level of minimum standard or be closed down (which raises the problem what should be done with the animals they keep).
Not all of sanctuaries are managed by experienced zoo professionals and staff, being able to deal with a variety of animals with different needs and requirements. Also the keeping conditions sometimes do not meet highest standards and in a number of instances the enclosures reach rather soon their carrying capacity, because it is usually very difficult if not impossible to release the animals into the wild (and also difficult to find suitable and appropriate places in zoos), making it impossible to further accept more animals.
This may give rise to unjustified critique towards zoos in general in particular by some animal rights groups, which object to the keeping of wild animals (and for that matter also of domestic animals and companion animals in human care). Keeping wild animals in zoos is even seen as human domination over other creatures. On the other hand, objective and science-based critique by the less extreme and recognized animal welfare organizations is usually well received and may lead to improvements of problematic keeping conditions in specific cases. The "umbrella organisation" worldwide for the world zoo and aquarium community today, the World Association of Zoos and Aquariums (WAZA) has a complaint procedure, allowing to follow up on complaints received from the public. 
Among the questions that may be raised are:
 the conditions under which animals are kept, often precipitated by some unusual event such as an escape or an accidental death, and commonly expanded into a challenge of the legitimacy of holding any animals captive;
 euthanasia generally, but particularly as relates to the disposal of genetic surplus or highly sentient individuals;
 the feeding of live prey and, in some cases, whole animal carcasses;
 transfers of individuals between zoos, particularly when social relationships that are believed to have attributes in common with those of humans are ruptured as a result;
 the use of animals in entertainment, especially performing animals;
 bringing new animals in from the wild to augment captive holdings or to start new breeding programs;
 the employment of invasive technologies such as embryo manipulation or exogenous hormonal stimulation in breeding efforts;
 all research involving animals, even when it is the health and longevity of animals that could benefit.

The modern type zoo aims to keep healthy, physically sound animals in natural surroundings, allowing them to behave naturally and normally. What is done in the interests of the animals kept is also done in the interest of the zoo visitors, who can thus observe the animals as if they were in nature.
The aims for the modern zoo are education, research, recreation and conservation. In fact modern zoos consider themselves as centers for conservation of biodiversity through captive breeding programs ("ex-situ" conservation) in particular of threatened species as well as various "in-situ" conservation programs, such as reintroduction and restocking projects, supporting in-situ conservation projects (protection of species and/or their habitat), transfer of knowledge and techniques, in situ educational programs aimed at the local people and at the politicians, biological programs (research and monitoring), socio-economic projects, social work among the local people, PR activities and much more on a national and international scale. Therefore, some zoos call themselves today "conservation parks" or "bioparks". In the world, zoos more and more see themselves as modern arks for endangered and rare species. Within the concept of the modern ark, even projects of “frozen zoos” have been initiated, where gametes and embryos are stored under deep-freeze conditions in order to preserve them for a very long time. The mission of WAZA is to provide leadership and support for zoos, aquariums, and partner organizations of the world in animal care and welfare, conservation of biodiversity, environmental education and global sustainability.

Indeed, zoos are at present rapidly evolving to serve in multiple ways as conservation centres. Professional capacities of concern and subjects communicated to the public in earlier phases of zoo development are now vital services to conservation. As conservation centres, zoos must additionally address sustainable relationships of humankind and nature, explain the values of ecosystems and the necessity of conserving biological diversity, practice the conservation ethic throughout zoo operations and cooperate within the world zoo network and with other conservation organizations.
In recent years, great emphasis has been placed on creating new and dynamic exhibits at zoos that provide significant enrichment opportunities for the animals on display while also offering visitors a unique viewing and learning experience.
Immersion exhibits involve zoo visitors in the environmental circumstances of the animals and such experiences are conductive to favorable reception by visitors of strong conservation messages.

Conservation

Integrated conservation
Only zoos, aquariums and botanic gardens can operate across the whole spectrum of conservation activities, from ex situ breeding of threatened species, research, public education, training and influencing and advocacy, through to in situ support of species, populations and their habitats. They uniquely have a massive ‘captive audience’ of visitors whose knowledge, understanding, attitude, behaviour and involvement can all be positively influenced and harnessed. They have a huge resource of technical skills and dedicated people. As habitats shrink and collection-managed populations grow, the definition of what is a zoo, what is a botanic garden, what is a reserve, and who is a collection-based conservationist, who is a field-based conservationist, will inevitably blur. Indeed, zoos, aquariums and botanic gardens have an opportunity to establish themselves as models of ‘integrated conservation’. In the German speaking part of Europe e.g. 45 zoos have united themselves in the “Foundation species conservation” with the purpose to advertise conservation projects on a large scale.

Today many animal species are threatened with extinction to a great extent because of increasing threats to their natural habitat.
Zoos do not only keep such species in their custody with a view to maintaining ex situ reserve populations, but they increasingly link their ex situ activities with conservation projects in the field (“in situ”).

With the human population worldwide constantly increasing together with an ever increase in demand for resources, and destruction of natural habitats, the role of zoos as conservation centres and arks will become even more important in the coming years, combined with accumulating experience and knowledge on ex-situ and in-situ conservation by the worldwide zoo community, which is increasingly committed to integrated conservation.

WAZA-branding of in situ projects

Members of the World Association of Zoos and Aquariums and the wider WAZA Network undertake or support thousands of in situ, or combined ex situ-in situ projects. It is estimated that zoos, aquariums and zoo and aquarium associations jointly expend in excess of 50 million euros per year for such projects. Reintroduction and restocking projects have been undertaken with about 200 species. In addition, in situ activities include now often also educational programmes aimed at the local people and at the politicians, biological programmes (research and monitoring), socio-economic projects, social work among the local people, public relations activities and much more on a national and international scale – all in order to secure the conservation efforts far into the future.

Since these efforts are largely invisible to the general public, in 2003 WAZA started allowing organisations to request and use the WAZA brand on projects executed or supported by the WAZA constituency. Currently more than 150 projects around the world are WAZA branded.

The World Zoo and Aquarium Conservation Strategy

In 1993, The World Zoo Organisation (IUDZG) and the Captive Breeding Specialist Group of The World Conservation Union (IUCN) published The World Zoo Conservation Strategy. That strategy defined, for the first time in a single document, the responsibilities and opportunities that the international zoo and aquarium community needed, in order to be fully involved in nature conservation. The pressures and threats to wildlife remain and have indeed increased. The need for help in conservation has intensified. It is therefore an opportune time for all zoos and aquariums to re-examine the ways and means by which they can consolidate and increase their support and involvement in conservation.
In 2005 a revised, second strategy, “Building a Future for Wildlife: the World Zoo and Aquarium Conservation Strategy”, was published by the World Zoo and Aquarium Association (WAZA). This document reinforces and expands the overall themes of the first document and presents a vision of the roles that all zoos and aquariums can and must play in the conservation of wildlife and of their ecosystems. The 72-page document, which is the result of assistance and advice from over 350 people, is truly international in its scope and in its production.
The Strategy is aimed at all zoos and aquariums, however large or small, however rich or poor, and not just those that are members of WAZA. The Strategy provides a common philosophy for zoos and aquariums across the globe and defines the standards and policies that are necessary to achieve their goals in conservation. The 2005 Strategy will be of use and interest not to only zoo and aquarium people but to anyone concerned with biodiversity conservation and sustainable development.
The document begins with a supportive foreword from the Director General of The World Conservation Union (IUCN), and a preface by the President of WAZA and by the Chair of the WAZA Conservation Committee, that set out the genesis and production of the Strategy. The document comprises nine chapters, with each chapter having a summary, a vision statement, a main text, conclusions, and a series of recommendations. 
This Strategy will be used by individual zoos and aquariums, by national and regional associations, and by WAZA itself, as the basis for the development of action plans for the implementation of the recommendations.

The document is available today in English, German and Russian. Bahasa, French, Japanese and Polish versions, as well as Urdu, Hindi, Bengali or Bangla, Dari and Singala summaries are currently under preparation.

In 2009, the World Zoo and Aquarium Conservation Strategy (WZACS) was especially implemented for the international aquarium community in the document entitled Turning the Tide: A Global Aquarium Strategy for Conservation and Sustainability.

Extinct in the wild - surviving in human care

According to the current IUCN Red List (2008), 37 animal species are extinct in the wild. Zoo-bred animals of several species listed by IUCN as extinct in the wild did survive in zoos and have been reintroduced to parts of their former range in recent years (Partula species, Père David's deer and the scimitar-horned oryx).

The IUCN list also contains other species which were extinct in the wild in the past but which have survived in human care, and several of them have been reintroduced by zoos and wildlife parks to their original habitat (Californian condor CR, red wolf CR, black-footed ferret EN, Przewalski's horse EN, mhorr gazelle CR, Arabian oryx VU,  European bison VU, American bison NT).
However the IUCN does not list two species of Seychelles giant tortoises which were rediscovered recently surviving in human care.

International studbooks

International studbooks for endangered and rare species are kept under the auspices of the World Association of Zoos and Aquariums (WAZA). In most cases, staff of WAZA member institutions serve as studbook keepers. The International Studbook Office is hosted by the Zoological Society of London, and a staff member of the WAZA executive office acts as International Studbook Coordinator. Within WAZA, the Committee on Population Management (CPM) is the body dealing primarily with studbook issues.
As of March 2008, there were 183 international studbooks including all subspecies and species that are kept as separate studbooks. Altogether, there are studbooks (international and regional) and/or breeding programmes for more than 850 different taxa.

Conservation breeding programs

Animal collections in individual zoos and aquariums are typically too small to be of much value to long-term conservation. Therefore, cooperative international or regional ex situ breeding programmes are required to form large, viable populations. These cooperative breeding programmes serve many purposes: providing animals for public educational and/or exhibit opportunities; providing fund-raising material; providing research collections from which to gain basic knowledge of animal biology and husbandry; and, on a larger scale, providing demographic and genetic backup to wild populations. To serve in all of these roles fully, these populations must be viable over the long term. This requires that they be demographically stable, healthy, well maintained and capable of self-sustaining reproduction, distributed among several institutions to lessen the risks of catastrophic loss, of sufficient size to maintain high levels of genetic diversity.
Conservation breeding programmes (such as the Species Survival Plan (SSP), established 1981, or the European Endangered Species Programme (EEP), established 1985) are typically organized at the level of the regional associations, in particular AZA and EAZA, because the exchange of animals between regions is expensive and - mainly due to veterinary restrictions - difficult. At its 2003 Annual Meeting, however, WAZA adopted a procedure for establishing interregional programmes, which may concern a number of species for which International Studbooks have been established.

Until today only few of the rare, endangered or extinct-in-the-wild species could be saved from complete extinction by keeping and breeding them in human care. But it may be well too early to really evaluate the contribution of zoos breeding programmes to the preservation of biodiversity.

Relationship with IUCN

WAZA provides financial support to IUCN Species Survival Commission and to its Specialist Groups, such as the South American Camelid Specialist Group.
WAZA promotes the use of the newly developed IUCN Red List of Threatened Species branding and many zoos and aquariums have already in 2010 made use of it.
WAZA has published on December 1, 2009, a book on ‘The Future of Wildlife’ to mark the 2010 International Year of Biodiversity, with contributions from partners including IUCN.
WAZA supports international endeavours for amphibian conservation and is partnering with IUCN and its Conservation Breeding Specialist Group in the ‘Amphibian Ark’.

Projects

WAZA works in partnership with international organisations with a view to contribute to the conservation of biodiversity. 
Two examples of WAZA supported projects on the occasion of the International Year of the Gorilla 2009 are:

The Nouabalé - Ndoki Project in Democratic Republic of the Congo is supported by the WCS (USA), Toronto Zoo (Canada), La Palmyre Zoo (France), La Vallée des Singes (France), USAID (CARPE program), USFWS, and FFEM. Since the early 90s, WCS aims to help conserve biodiversity in Congo by working with the government, local communities and private sector partners to adopt a landscape scale management approach, establishing and maintaining a network of well-managed protected areas,
including the Nouabalé - Ndoki National Park.

Conservation of the Cross River gorilla in Nigeria, implemented by Kolmarden Foundation, the Great Ape Trust of Iowa (Iowa Zoo), Columbus Zoo, Zoo Boise, supported by Wildlife Conservation Society (Bronx Zoo), Great Ape Conservation Fund (US Fish and Wildlife Service), African Great Apes Programme (WWF), Margot Marsh Biodiversity Foundation, Berggorilla and Regenwald Direkthilfe, North Carolina Zoo.
The Cross River gorilla project in Nigeria has four main
components:
Support for protected area development
Landscape level conservation action
Research
Conservation education

Education
Zoos and aquariums appeal to a very broad audience and have huge visitor numbers throughout the world. They enable people to develop appreciation, wonder, respect, understanding, care and concern about nature. They therefore have the potential to be a very important source of environmental awareness, training and action for a sustainable future on a local, national, regional or international scale. In fact they are excellent centres in which to inform people about the natural world and the need for its conservation. Awareness can be converted into action with positive benefits for wildlife, people and conservation.

Living animals have an enormous power of attraction. Seeing, hearing and smelling them has huge educational significance in itself. The primary goal of living exhibits is education and educators increasingly are involved in the design of the exhibits. Animals are displayed in more natural settings, mixed exhibits and/or exhibits provide contextual story-led or message-driven experiences, using a variety of interpretation techniques. With an increasingly urbanized population, this contact with nature is of vital importance and zoos build on it to promote and support conservation. Visitors will then more easily understand the concepts of biodiversity and the interdependence of species, habitats and ecosystems, and recognize the links with human actions.

Zoos and aquariums have recognized that the visitors’ experience is also affected by the welfare of the animals and their enclosures. Zoos therefore ensure that positive educational messages are not compromised or confused by poor conditions or poor husbandry and that the animals are exhibited in the best conditions possible, in enclosures that enable them to live as naturally as possible and to exhibit natural behaviour as far as possible.

Furthermore, enclosures clearly and correctly identify the animals in them. Signs highlight threatened species and species in regional, national and international coordinated breeding programmes.

A number of activities allow informal education, such as keeper talks, close encounters, hands-on experiences, exhibits that allow visitor access, exhibits with a clear biological theme. Whenever animal demonstrations form part of the programme, they contain an education or conservation message.

Resource material and education information is displayed and made available to the general public and zoo audience. This includes leaflets, guidebooks, teachers’ notes, resource packs and worksheets.

WAZA provides interactive, structured educational workshops, classes, and resources tailored to meet the specific needs of groups, zoos and aquariums and contribute to learning and understanding as part of local and national curricula frameworks. Many zoos now have an education department, a classroom, and full-time educational officers.

WAZA encourages all of its staff to participate in local, national, regional and international networks such as the International Zoo Educators Association (IZEA) and its regional groups.

Research
Today, through their living collections, zoos and aquariums can make a unique contribution to conservation-directed research. No other network of institutions can provide, as a resource for study, representative populations of so diverse an array of the world's wildlife. In addition, zoos and aquariums offer a rare venue for researchers and the public to meet and communicate, providing a platform for interpreting the outcome of research and explaining the implications for conservation action.

There are two main divisions of research in zoos and aquariums: (1) research that is aimed at new knowledge to help the institution achieve its goals, and (2) research that is undertaken in a zoo by others to achieve their own goals, without being inconsistent with those of the organization. Under the first division would fall research on husbandry, visitor preferences, educational and interpretation methods, conservation approaches etc., to a greater or lesser extent depending on a zoo's particular mission. The latter division would include assisting researchers from universities and research organizations by providing access to and or material from non-domesticated species for comparative analyses. 
It is impossible to describe all of the research undertaken by and at zoos and aquariums. Though there are areas of overlap, research can be divided into the following categories: 
 research in pure and applied biological science (including small population biology, animal welfare, wildlife medicine, physiology, nutrition, behaviour, reproductive biology, genetics, evolution, and taxonomy);
 in situ conservation research (e.g. field-based ecological and habitat research);
 research aimed at identifying and improving zoo and aquarium operations (for example research on visitor learning, the effectiveness of exhibits and programmes, marketing and messaging, membership, and development and fund-raising).

Recreation
Although recreation is today not the main aim of zoos anymore, it is clear that it plays still a very important role. People, especially from urbanized areas are often alienated from nature, have in a zoo the opportunity to relax and to enjoy a naturalistic environment in their very neighborhood. The profound positive influence nature – also in form of plants and companion animals – has on the psychic well-being of men, women and children in the very hectic, technical (and often virtual) world today has been demonstrated many times. Zoos make here no exception. They are places without the daily stress of the professional life, usually places of quiet and calmness with profound positive emotional experiences that allow people to immerge into another world – even in the middle of busy cities. This therefore is also one of the many reasons why zoos are visited today by young and old by the millions.

Zoos personnel know that this experience is possible only if visitors have the impression that the animals are healthy and well kept in naturalistic habitat-like enclosures. Therefore, when planning new exhibits today this is taken into consideration.

Ethic

Care of animals
Within the twentieth century great strides had been made in the development of management methods and of principles and techniques relating to the maintenance of captive populations that increasingly satisfied the physical and psychological needs of the animals.
Together with the increasing practical experiences in modern animal husbandry, various developments in the science of veterinary medicine (in particular prevention and control of parasites and causes of disease), enormous technical advances and the accumulation of knowledge of all kinds, it became possible to venture exhibits which before had not seemed possible.
Zoos today provide exhibits of such size, volume, structure and objects as to allow the animals to express their natural behaviours. Also the animals are provided areas to which they may retreat. In addition separate facilities are available to allow separation of animals where necessary, e.g. cubbing dens. Efforts are made to protected animals at all times from conditions detrimental to their well-being.

Proper feeding management of wild animals in zoos and aquariums incorporates both husbandry skills and applied nutritional sciences. As a basic foundation of animal management, nutrition is integral to longevity, disease prevention, growth and reproduction. Additionally food collecting and/or gathering contributes to behavioral enrichment and provides occupation. Quite elaborate systems of food presentation (dead rats) have been developed (e.g. in Switzerland for wild cats), where computer programmed various mechanic devices allow the animals in the enclosure to search for prey as in their natural environment. However, in some cases animals in zoos need to be fed with other live animals, because they would not eat non-living food items. Whenever this has to be done however, the prey should have, as in natural conditions, a possibility to hide and it must be assured that the prey animal is killed as quickly as possible without pain and suffering. Whenever the animals accept dead prey or food items, they are not to be given live animals as food.

Indeed, most contemporary zoos led by professionals are aware of environmental enrichment, also called behavioral enrichment, as a part of the daily care of animals. Environmental enrichment refers to the practice of providing animals with environmental stimuli. The goal of environmental enrichment is to improve an animal's quality of life by increasing physical activity, stimulating natural behaviors, and preventing or reducing stereotypical behaviours.
  
Also the use of behavioral training, as another method of behavioral enrichment, has often contributed to the animals well-being as well as allowed zoos to improve dramatically their ability to care for animals, while reducing animal stress and increasing safety for both keeper and animal during care procedures. It is self-evident that such training must be done by expert keepers in a way that is appropriate to the animals, based on biological and scientifically sound learning principles.

Management of animals

At the beginning of the twentieth century, zoos acquired many animals that were caught in the wild. Today however zoos acquire animals much more frequently through their ex-situ breeding programs, trade or exchange (or loans and gifts) among zoos (often following the advice of the appropriate Species Co-ordinators). Zoos make sure that institutions receiving their animals have appropriate facilities to hold them and skilled staff that are capable of maintaining the same high standard of husbandry and welfare as they themselves. However it is recognized that, from time to time, there is a legitimate need for conservation breeding programs, education programs or basic biological studies, to obtain animals from the wild. The collection, trade, and transport of wild animals is strictly regulated today by national and international legislation (in particular CITES, IATA and OIE) and is controlled by government agencies. In particular the CITES provisions make sure that such acquisitions will not have a deleterious effect upon the wild population. Various surveys have shown however that the acquisition of wild caught animals (in particular mammals, birds and reptiles) by zoos has decreased significantly in the last years and that zoos increasingly manage to maintain their collections without introduction of animals caught in the wild. Indeed, many species are bred in zoos using sophisticated, and expensive, scientific procedures.

The situation is somewhat different for aquaria, where – although an increasing number of fish and invertebrates can be bred in human care – still newly acquired animals are predominantly wild-caught. One of the reasons is that reproduction in aquaria just has not been possible yet or is – still – too expensive.

In fact the World Zoo Conservation Strategy published in 1993 states "that the commercial wild animal trade as a source of zoo animals should cease as soon as possible. Such animals as must be collected from the wild must be collected for specific educational and conservation purposes. They should not be chosen from dealers’ lists of animals randomly collected for commercial purposes." These goals, while more pertinent in 1993, are still valid and show up again in the World Zoo and Aquarium Conservation Strategy published in 2005. Since then, this has meant that zoos disapprove of selling their “surplus” animals to animal dealers, auctions and game farms, unaccredited zoos and individuals without the necessary knowledge and expertise, respectively without the keeping-license required by national legislation.

All animals being transferred are usually accompanied today by appropriate records with details of health, diet, reproductive and genetic status and behavioural characteristics having been disclosed at the commencement of negotiations. These records will allow the receiving institution to make appropriate decisions regarding the future management of the animal. All animal transfers must conform to the international standards and laws applying to the particular species. Where appropriate or required by legislation, animals are accompanied by qualified staff.

Government agencies and animal welfare organizations also contact zoos whenever the need arises to place an animal confiscated because it has been illegally imported or acquired or has been rescued from unsuitable circumstances and which needs special and expert care and appropriate housing. Zoos usually are cooperative but they also may have to decline to take such animals in their custody when e.g. they do not have appropriate quarantine facilities, have no appropriate enclosures, fear the risk of disease when accepting an animal of unknown origin, don't see any purpose in incorporating an animal of unknown origin into their breeding program or see no way how such an animal could be integrated socially into their group of conspecifics.

In keeping with the requirements of animal welfare standards, the adaptive capacity of wild animals in zoos must not be compromised, nor their functional capabilities allowed to atrophy. Furthermore, animals in zoos must be kept in a manner that accommodates their natural behaviour. Reproductive behaviour is central to this consideration. Reproduction in all its aspects (courtship, pair bonding, nest building, parents-infant bonding, socialization of the young, integrating offspring into the group, influencing the social structure, transfer of knowledge, capabilities and traditions etc.) is indeed a significant part of the animal's natural behaviour. Impeding reproduction may cause distress, social disorder, deprivation etc. Therefore, generally speaking, animals should not be prevented from breeding. However whilst this principle is valid for all animal species irrespective of their anthropocentric emotional value, it is not applicable to each and every individual. In the implementation of this principle, it may be necessary to humanely euthanize individual animals at times that approximate certain critical events they would encounter in the wild state (e.g. birth, weaning, leaving the family group). In nature animals generally produce surplus offspring and not every individual is actually able to reproduce. In addition to the already mentioned critical phases in the life cycle of an animal, various other factors such as emigration, immigration, disease, predation, competition, famine and climate regulate population sizes. Reproductive management in zoos should reflect natural circumstances. In regulating the size of their animal stocks and populations zoos thus may pursue the following strategies:
 Relocate surplus to other suitable and appropriate facilities.
 Release to sanctuaries.
 Release into the wild within the framework of coordinated species recovery projects, respecting the IUCN guidelines and all legal requirements.
 Temporarily impede reproduction in a humane and ethical manner (group management, contraception, sterilization, artificial insemination etc.).

When contraception is considered, the possible side effects of both surgical and chemical contraception, as well as the negative impact on behavior and social structure of the group should be considered before the final decision to implement contraception is made.

When all options have been investigated and none of these measures are feasible without causing stress or impacting upon group behaviour and the decision is taken that it is necessary to euthanize an animal, care will be taken to ensure it is carried out in a fear free environment and a manner that ensures a quick death without suffering. Euthanasia may be controlled by local customs and laws but should always be used in preference to keeping an animal alive under conditions which do not allow it to experience an appropriate quality of life. Whenever possible a post-mortem examination should be performed and biological material preserved for research and gene conservation. If ethics and legislation allows it, there is nothing wrong with “recycling” remains of such animals into the zoo's own food chain.

Zoos usually avoid talking about death. In particular, they do not convey that sometimes it may be unavoidable to kill animals with a view of keeping a breeding programme alive and viable.
The largest problem for long-term conservation breeding at zoos will be the lack of understanding by the public that nature is based on surplus, i.e. that always more animals are born than are necessary for maintaining their own species, and that these surplus animals will end up in the food chain, thus ensuring the survival of other species.

Secretariat
A permanent Executive Office has been established in October 2001. The Office was located in the centre of Berne, Switzerland at this time. From May 2010 to September 2018, the WAZA Executive Office was situated in the heart of IUCN's newly built Conservation Centre in Gland, Switzerland. The permanent executive office of WAZA is currently located in the city of Barcelona, Spain.

Under a MOU it provides also secretariat support to the International Zoo Educators Association (IZEA).

See also
 List of WAZA member zoos and aquariums
 List of zoo associations

Notes

References
 The World Zoo Conservation Strategy: The Role of the Zoos and Aquaria of the World in Global Conservation, IUDZG-International Union of Directors of Zoological Gardens and The Captive Breeding Specialist Group of IUCN/SSC, Chicago Zoological Society, 1993. 
 Building a Future for Wildlife – The World Zoo and Aquarium Conservation Strategy, WAZA, Berne, 2005. 
 Understanding Animals and Protecting Them – About the World Zoo and Aquarium Conservation Strategy, WAZA Executive Office, Berne, 2006.
 Turning the Tide: A Global Aquarium Strategy for Conservation and Sustainability, WAZA, Berne, 2009. 
 Dick, Gerald and Gusset, Markus (ed.), Building a Future for Wildlife: Zoos and Aquariums Committed to Biodiversity Conservation, World Association of Zoos and Aquariums, Berne, 2009. 
 Dollinger, Peter, Robin, Klaus, Smolinski, Thomas, and Weber, Felix (ed.), Ramifications of the reproductive management of animals in zoos, Proceedings of the Rigi Symposium, WAZA Executive Office, Berne, 2004.

External links
 
 "The Ramsar Convention on Wetlands" (Ramsar)
 "Convention on Migratory Species" (CMS)
 "Convention on Biological Diversity" (CBD)
 "Convention on International Trade in Endangered Species of Wild Fauna and Flora" (CITES)

Zoo associations
Organizations established in 1935
1935 establishments in Switzerland
Organizations based in Europe